Walden is the Statutory Town that is the county seat, the most populous community, and the only incorporated municipality in Jackson County, Colorado, United States. It is situated in the center of a large open valley called North Park. People from Walden and the surrounding area refer to themselves as "North Parkers". The town population was 608 at the 2010 census. It was established in 1889 and was incorporated 2 December 1890. Mark A. Walden, an early postmaster, gave the community his name.

Geography
Walden is located at  (40.730606, -106.281811).

Climate
Due to its elevation, Walden has a semi-arid climate (BSk), closely bordering on a subalpine climate (Köppen climate classification Dfc).

Demographics

As of the census of 2000, there were 734 people, 330 households, and 207 families residing in the town. The racial makeup of the town was 96.32% White, 0.14% African American, 1.36% Native American, 0.14% Asian, 0.82% from other races, and 1.23% from two or more races. Hispanic or Latino of any race were 6.95% of the population.

There were 330 households, out of which 29.7% had children under the age of 18 living with them, 44.8% were married couples living together, 12.1% had a female householder with no husband present, and 37.0% were non-families. 34.5% of all households were made up of individuals, and 12.1% had someone living alone who was 65 years of age or older. The average household size was 2.21 and the average family size was 2.82.

In the town, the population was spread out, with 25.9% under the age of 18, 6.8% from 18 to 24, 25.5% from 25 to 44, 26.0% from 45 to 64, and 15.8% who were 65 years of age or older. The median age was 40 years. For every 100 females, there were 98.4 males. For every 100 females age 18 and over, there were 99.3 males.

The median income for a household in the town was $29,313, and the median income for a family was $34,423. Males had a median income of $31,111 versus $18,611 for females. The per capita income for the town was $16,964. About 14.2% of families and 20.3% of the population were below the poverty line, including 35.3% of those under age 18 and 8.8% of those age 65 or over.

The 2010 census shows that the population decreased to 608 individuals, 377 households, and 291 families residing in the town. There were 318 males, 290 females, 116 individuals under the age of 18, and 492 individuals over the age of 18, with a distribution as follows: 20-24=29, 25-34=63, 35-49=121, 50-64=151, and 65 and over=113. Ethnically, 82 individuals are Hispanic or Latino and 526 individuals are Non-Hispanic or Latino. The race distribution is as follows: 554 White, 0 African American, 0 Asian, 8 American Indian and Alaska Native, 0 Native Hawaiian and Pacific Islander, 34 Other, and 12 who identified by two or more races.

Transportation
 State Highway 14
 State Highway 125

OATS (Older Americans Transport Service) provides seniors with transportation to Laramie, Wyoming or Steamboat Springs, CO and to Denver International Airport.

See also

 List of municipalities in Colorado

References

External links

 
 Walden/North Park Chamber of Commerce
 CDOT map of the Town of Walden

Towns in Jackson County, Colorado
Towns in Colorado
County seats in Colorado